Dasanakoppa is a village in Dharwad district of Karnataka, India.

Demographics
As of the 2011 Census of India there were 35 households in Dasanakoppa and a total population of 238 consisting of 121 males and 117 females. There were 21 children ages 0-6.

References

Villages in Dharwad district